Kameron Hankerson (born August 8, 1998) is an American professional basketball player for the Long Island Nets of the NBA G League. He played college basketball for the Green Bay Phoenix.

Early life and high school career
Hankerson attended Novi High School in Novi, Michigan. As a junior, he averaged 9 points, 4 assists, 5 rebounds, and 2 blocks per game, earning All-Kensington Conference recognition. During his senior season, Hankerson had a partially torn lateral collateral ligament in his knee and missed the final month of the season. Hankerson was ranked the 16th best prospect in Michigan and signed with Green Bay in November 2015.

College career
As a freshman, Hankerson averaged 3.1 points in eight minutes per game. Following the season, he spent much time in the gym and focused on eating right and lifting weights to get in shape. On March 2, 2018, Hankerson scored a career-high 36 points in a 93–81 win against Detroit Mercy in the first round of the Horizon League tournament. He averaged 10.7 points, 3.1 rebounds, and 2.6 assists per game as a sophomore, shooting 38.7 percent from three-point range. As a junior, Hankerson averaged 8.1 points per game on a team that finished 21–17 and reached the final of the CollegeInsider.com Postseason Tournament. He finished third on the team in scoring at 11.1 points per game as a senior, finishing his career with over 1,000 points.

Professional career
On September 3, 2020, Hankerson signed his first professional contract with Ehingen Urspring of the German ProA.

Long Island Nets (2022–present)
On November 4, 2022, Hankerson was named to the opening night roster for the Long Island Nets.

Personal life
Hankerson's younger brother Trendon plays basketball for Northern Illinois.

References

External links
Green Bay Phoenix bio

Living people
American men's basketball players
American expatriate basketball people in Germany
Shooting guards
Green Bay Phoenix men's basketball players
Ehingen Urspring players
People from Novi, Michigan
Basketball players from Michigan
1998 births